Count Tivadar Batthyány de Németújvár (23 February 1859 in Zalaszentgrót, Zala County – 2 February 1931 in  Budapest) son of Count Zsigmond Batthyány de Német-Ujvár, and Johanna Nepomucena Justina Maria Goberta Erdődy. 

The father, Count Zsigmond Batthyány, was actively involved in the 1848 revolution and become adjutant of Richard Debaufre Guyon.
The firstborn son, Count Tivadar Batthyány, went to high school in Kalocsa but completed it in Fiume, graduated from the Royal Hungarian Marine Academy in Fiume. A navy officer, he was promoted Korvettenkapitän in 1917. 
In 1881 nominated long distance marine captain, in 1882 principal inspecting officer in the port of Fiume, and commander of the floating docks; in 1883 the Hungarian trade minister Széchenyi decided to create a Central Maritime office at the government, nominated Tivadar Batthyány secretary of the Ministry of trade and member of the board of "Adria", with the function of governmental fiduciary.   
In 1890 general shipping inspector of "Adria" 1892 first time in the parliament, representing the liberal party, as deputy of Fiume. In 1904 representative of the Independence and 1848 party. In 1909 briefly (14 October - 12 November) Second Vice-Chairman of the House of Representatives. 1910 Vice-President of the Independence Party. In 1918 Minister of Labor and Social Care. Member of the National Council (31 October - 12 December 1918). Minister of the Interior, entrusted by the King about the liquidation of the Ministry (1-18 November). During the period of the Hungarian Soviet Republic he resided in Vienna. In 1921 Count Tivadar Batthyány tried to return in the Independence Party, but he had no longer a major role in political life.

References

1859 births
1931 deaths
People from Zalaszentgrót
Tivadar
Liberal Party (Hungary) politicians
Party of Independence and '48 politicians
Hungarian Interior Ministers
Foreign ministers of Hungary